Anarcho-primitivism is an anarchist critique of civilization (anti-civ) that advocates a return to non-civilized ways of life through deindustrialization, abolition of the division of labor or specialization, and abandonment of large-scale organization and all technology other than prehistoric technology. Anarcho-primitivists critique the origins and progress of the Industrial Revolution and industrial society. According to anarcho-primitivism, the shift from hunter-gatherer to agricultural subsistence during the Neolithic Revolution gave rise to coercion, social alienation, and social stratification.

Many classical anarchists reject the critique of civilization while some such as Wolfi Landstreicher endorse the critique without considering themselves anarcho-primitivists. Anarcho-primitivists are distinguished by the focus on the praxis of achieving a feral state of being through "rewilding".

History

Origins 

The writings of Henry David Thoreau, particularly his 1854 book Walden, have been seen as a precursor to anarcho-primitivism, due to his advocacy of simple living and self-sufficiency among natural surroundings in resistance to the advancement of industrial civilization. John Zerzan himself included the text "Excursions" (1863) by Thoreau in his edited compilation of anti-civilization writings called Against Civilization: Readings and Reflections from 1999.

Recent themes 
Anarchists contribute to an anti-authoritarian push, which challenges all abstract power on a fundamental level, striving for egalitarian relationships and promoting communities based upon mutual aid. Primitivists, however, extend ideas of non-domination to all life, not just human life, going beyond the traditional anarchist's analysis. Using the work of anthropologists, primitivists look at the origins of civilization so as to understand what they are up against and how current society formed in order to inform a change in direction. Inspired by the Luddites, primitivists rekindle an anti-technological orientation.

Main concepts 

Primitivists hold that following the emergence of agriculture the growing masses of humanity became evermore beholden to technology ("technoaddiction"). 

Primitivism has drawn heavily upon cultural anthropology and archaeology. From the 1960s forward, societies once viewed as "barbaric" were reevaluated by academics, some of whom now hold that early humans lived in relative peace and prosperity in what has been called the "original affluent society". Frank Hole, an early-agriculture specialist, and Kent Flannery, a specialist in Mesoamerican civilization, have noted that, "No group on earth has more leisure time than hunters and gatherers, who spend it primarily on games, conversation and relaxing." Based on evidence that life expectancy has decreased with the adoption of agriculture, the anthropologist Mark Nathan Cohen has called for the need to revise the traditional idea that civilization represents progress in human well-being.

Scholars such as Karl Polanyi and Marshall Sahlins characterized primitive societies as gift economies with "goods valued for their utility or beauty rather than cost; commodities exchanged more on the basis of need than of exchange value; distribution to the society at large without regard to labor that members have invested; labor performed without the idea of a wage in return or individual benefit, indeed largely without the notion of 'work' at all."

Civilization and violence 
Based on several anthropological references, they further state that hunter-gatherer societies are less susceptible to war, violence, and disease.

However, somesuch as Lawrence Keelycontest this, citing that many tribe-based people are more prone to violence than developed states.

Domestication 
Anarcho-primitivists, such as John Zerzan, define domestication as "the will to dominate animals and plants", claiming that domestication is "civilization's defining basis".

Consumerism and mass society 
Brian Sheppard asserts that anarcho-primitivism is not a form of anarchism at all. In Anarchism vs. Primitivism he says: "In recent decades, groups of quasi-religious mystics have begun equating the primitivism they advocate (rejection of science, rationality, and technology often lumped together under a blanket term "technology") with anarchism. In reality, the two have nothing to do with each other."

Andrew Flood agrees with this assertion and points out that primitivism clashes with what he identifies as the fundamental goal of anarchism: "the creation of a free mass society".

Primitivists do not believe that a "mass society" can be free. They believe industry and agriculture inevitably lead to hierarchy and alienation. They argue that the division of labor techno-industrial societies require to function forces people into reliance on factories and the labor of other specialists to produce their food, clothing, shelter, and other necessities and that this dependence forces them to remain a part of this society, whether they like it or not.

Critique of mechanical time and symbolic culture 

Regarding those primitivists who have extended their critique of symbolic culture to language itself, Georgetown University professor Mark Lance describes this particular theory of primitivism as "literally insane, for proper communication is necessary to create within the box a means to destroy the box".

and counter-criticism 
Notable critics of anarcho-primitivism include post-left anarchists Wolfi Landstreicher and Jason McQuinn, Ted Kaczynski (the "Unabomber"), and especially libertarian socialist Murray Bookchin, as seen in his polemical work entitled Social Anarchism or Lifestyle Anarchism.

Wording and semantics 
Activist writer Derrick Jensen wrote in Walking on Water that he is often classified as a "Luddite" and "an anarcho-primitivist. Both of these labels fit well enough, I suppose." Others, too, have designated his work with the latter term; however, more recently, Jensen began to categorically reject the "primitivist" label, describing it as a "racist way to describe indigenous peoples". He prefers to be called "indigenist" or an "ally to the indigenous".

Hypocrisy 
A common criticism is of hypocrisy, i.e. that people rejecting civilization typically maintain a civilized lifestyle themselves, often while still using the very industrial technology that they oppose in order to spread their message. Jensen counters that this criticism merely resorts to an ad hominem argument, attacking individuals but not the actual validity of their beliefs. He further responds that working to entirely avoid such hypocrisy is ineffective, self-serving, and a convenient misdirection of activist energies. Primitivist John Zerzan admits that living with this hypocrisy is a necessary evil for continuing to contribute to the larger intellectual conversation. Jason Godesky holds that the charge of hypocrisy is a generalization, affirming that "not all primitivists are against technology in and of itself; only some. Many primitivists hold a view that technology is ambiguous ... So, the charge of hypocrisy only holds up if we extend the beliefs of some primitivists to all primitivists, or to primitivism itself."

Glorification of indigenous societies 
Wolfi Landstreicher and Jason McQuinn, post-leftists, have both criticized the romanticized exaggerations of indigenous societies and the pseudoscientific (and even mystical) appeal to nature they perceive in anarcho-primitivist ideology and deep ecology. Zerzan has countered that the anarcho-primitivist view is not idealizing the indigenous, but rather "has been the mainstream view presented in anthropology and archaeology textbooks for the past few decades. It sounds utopian, but it's now the generally accepted paradigm".

Ted Kaczynski has also argued that certain anarcho-primitivists have exaggerated the short working week of primitive society, arguing that they only examine the process of food extraction and not the processing of food, creation of fire and childcare, which adds up to over 40 hours a week.

Criticism from social anarchists 
Besides Murray Bookchin, many class struggle oriented and social anarchists criticize primitivism as offering "no way forwards in the struggle for a free society" and that "often its adherents end up undermining that struggle by attacking the very things, like mass organization, that are a requirement to win it". Other social anarchists have also argued that abandoning technology will have dangerous consequences, pointing out that around 50% of the population of the United Kingdom requires glasses and would be left severely impaired. Radioactive waste would need to be monitored for tens of thousands of years with high-tech equipment to prevent it from leaking into ecosystems, the millions of people who need regular treatment for illnesses would die and the removal of books, recorded music, medical equipment, central heating, and sanitation would result in a rapid decline in the quality of life. Furthermore, social anarchists contend that without advanced agriculture the Earth's surface would not be able to support billions of people, meaning that building a primitivist society would require the death of billions.

See also 

 Anarcho-primitivists (category)
 Abecedarians, opposed language on religious grounds
 Agrarian socialism
 Antimodernism
 Deep ecology
 Degrowth
 Deindustrialization
 Doomer
 Earth liberation
 Eco-communalism
 Ecofeminism
 Ecofascism
 Environmental ethics
 Evolutionary psychology
 Freedomites
 Green anarchism
 Green Anarchy
 Hunter-gatherer
 Idea of Progress
 Jacques Camatte
 Neo-Luddism
 Neo-tribalism
 Noble savage
 Post-left anarchy
 Primitive communism
 Romanticism
 State of nature
 Survivalism
 Year Zero (political notion)
 Liver King
 Rewilding (conservation biology)
 Back-to-the-land movement
 Solarpunk

Notes

Bibliography

Further reading

Books

Periodicals 
 Green Anarchy: An Anti-Civilization Journal of Theory and Action
 Species Traitor: An Insurrectionary Anarcho-Primitivist Journal
 Disorderly Conduct (journal)
 Fifth Estate: An Anti-Authoritarian Magazine of Ideas and Action

Web

External links 

 
Primitivism
Criticism of science
Cultural anthropology
Political ideologies
Post-left anarchism
Simple living
Social philosophy
Syncretic political movements